The Municipality of Poljčane is a municipality in the traditional region of Styria in northeastern Slovenia. The seat of the municipality is the town of Poljčane. Poljčane became a municipality in 2006.

Settlements
In addition to the municipal seat of Poljčane, the municipality also includes the following settlements:

 Brezje pri Poljčanah
 Čadramska Vas
 Globoko ob Dravinji
 Hrastovec pod Bočem
 Krasna
 Križeča Vas
 Ljubično
 Lovnik
 Lušečka Vas
 Modraže
 Novake
 Podboč
 Spodnja Brežnica
 Spodnje Poljčane
 Stanovsko
 Studenice
 Zgornje Poljčane

References

External links

Municipality of Poljčane on Geopedia
Municipality of Poljčane website

 
Poljčane
2006 establishments in Slovenia